Shabanak (also Romanized as Shabānak and Sha’bank) is a village in Dodangeh-ye Sofla Rural District, Ziaabad District, Takestan County, Qazvin Province, Iran. At the 2006 census, its population was 50, in 10 families.

References 

Populated places in Takestan County